Driss Joumad (20 May 1927 – 18 September 2009) is a former Morocco international football striker.

Club career
Born in Casablanca, Joumad began playing football with the youth teams of Wydad Casablanca in the 1940s. He joined the senior side at age 18, and would help the club win the 1947–48 Botola title without losing a match.

In 1954, he moved to France to play for FC Girondins de Bordeaux. He made several appearances in his first season, but suffered a serious knee injury in a cup match against Le Mans which limited his ability to continue playing.

After he retired, Joumad became a football manager and led French regional side Royan Vaux AFC.

International career
Joumad made 92 appearances for the Morocco national football team.

Personal
Joumad died in a Rabat military hospital following a long illness at age 86.

References

External links

1927 births
2009 deaths
Association football forwards
Moroccan footballers
Morocco international footballers
Wydad AC players
FC Girondins de Bordeaux players